Spreecast, Inc. was an Internet application and free social video broadcasting platform.

The company was founded in 2011 by Jeff Fluhr, founder and former CEO of online ticketing marketplace StubHub, and is based in San Francisco, California
. According to Fluhr, spreecast seeks "to bring face-to-face interactions to the Internet in a far-reaching way".

The company tweeted out on June 15, 2016, that their site would be shutting down on July 14.

History 

Spreecast was launched as a public beta on November 10, 2011. In December 2011, spreecast received $4 million in seed venture funding from Frank Biondi, Gordon Crawford, and Edward W. Scott. In September 2012, they raised an additional $7 million. The company added social media author Gary Vaynerchuk as an advisor in February 2012. They closed their website on July 14, 2016

Celebrity Guests 
Elisa Jordana, Radio Personality, musician, and writer.

Reese Witherspoon, American actress and film producer

Randi Zuckerberg, American internet entrepreneur and former marketing director of Facebook

One Direction, a British-Irish boy band

Jennifer Grassman, American journalist, pianist, and singer

Scott Baker (journalist), American journalist for TheBlaze

Britney Spears, American recording artist and entertainer

Miley Cyrus, American recording artist and entertainer.

Anderson Cooper American Journalist

Neil Patrick Harris, American actor, producer, and director.

References

External links
 Spreecast website
 Spreecast official blog

Online mass media companies of the United States
Internet properties established in 2008
Companies based in San Francisco